Lists of sports venues includes sport venue-related lists:

Lists

By capacity
List of sports venues by capacity
List of cricket grounds by capacity
List of horse racing venues by capacity
List of indoor arenas by capacity
List of motor racing venues by capacity
List of rugby league stadiums by capacity
List of rugby union stadiums by capacity
List of stadiums by capacity

See also

List of indoor arenas
List of motor racing tracks
List of NASCAR race tracks
List of stadiums
List of sponsored sports stadiums
List of future stadiums
List of rowing venues
List of tennis venues
List of velodromes

References

External links

 
Venues
Venues